The Division of Bradfield is an Australian electoral division in the state of New South Wales.

History

Bradfield was created in the 1949 expansion of Parliament, and was named in honour of Dr John Bradfield, the designer of the Sydney Harbour Bridge. Its first member was Billy Hughes, a former Prime Minister of Australia and the last serving member of the first federal Parliament. The bulk of the seat was carved out of North Sydney, which Hughes represented from 1923 to 1949.  After Hughes, its best-known member was Brendan Nelson, a minister in the third and fourth Howard Governments and the federal Leader of the Opposition from 2007 to 2008. The current Member for Bradfield, since the 2009 Bradfield by-election, is Paul Fletcher, a member of the Liberal Party of Australia.

Located in the traditional Liberal stronghold of Sydney's North Shore, Bradfield has been in Liberal hands for its entire existence, and for most of that time has been reckoned as a very safe Liberal seat. Indeed, most of the territory covered by the seat has been represented by centre-right MPs since Federation. 

The Liberal hold on the seat has only been even remotely threatened twice. Af a 1952 by-election triggered by Hughes’ death, the Liberals were held to 58 percent of the two-party vote–the only time that Labor has come anywhere close to winning the seat. Even in 1952, the Liberals still won more than enough primary votes to retain the seat without the need for preferences.

In the 2022 federal election, Voices of Bradfield-endorsed independent candidate Nicolette Boele slashed the Liberal margin in the seat from 16.56% to 4.23%, turning Bradfield into a marginal seat on a two-candidate preferred basis for the first time in its history, amid the collapse of Liberal support in the North Shore. The Liberal primary vote plummeted to 45.05%, the first time the Liberal Party received less than 50% of the primary vote in Bradfield. The primary vote swing against the Liberal Party of 15.28% was also the largest in the country.

Boundaries and demographics
Since 1984, federal electoral division boundaries in Australia have been determined at redistributions by a redistribution committee appointed by the Australian Electoral Commission. Redistributions occur for the boundaries of divisions in a particular state, and they occur every seven years, or sooner if a state's representation entitlement changes or when divisions of a state are malapportioned.

The electorate is located in the upper North Shore and covers an area of approximately 101 km2, covering the suburbs Castle Cove, East Killara, East Lindfield, Gordon, Killara, Lindfield, North Turramurra, North Wahroonga, Pymble, Roseville, Roseville Chase, South Turramurra, St Ives, St Ives Chase, Turramurra, Wahroonga, Waitara, Warrawee, and West Pymble; as well as parts of Asquith, Chatswood, Chatswood West, Hornsby, Mount Colah, and Normanhurst. The electorate has undergone minor boundary changes, with the latest redistribution in 2016 shifting slightly south, gaining Castle Cove and parts of Chatswood from North Sydney while losing parts of Thornleigh, Normanhurst and Hornsby.

As at the 2011 Census, households within the Division of Bradfield had the highest level of median weekly household income of any electorate in Australia.

Members

Election results

References

External links
 Division of Bradfield - Australian Electoral Commission

Electoral divisions of Australia
Constituencies established in 1949
1949 establishments in Australia